The Haitón del Guarataro is a solutional cave system in the Sierra de San Luis in Falcón State, Venezuela,  south-east of Curimagua. It is the deepest limestone cave in Venezuela, and the entrance is a tourist attraction within the Juan Crisóstomo Falcón National Park. It was first explored and surveyed in April 1973 by members of the Venezuela '73 British Karst Research Expedition. It is formed in Oligocene reefal limestone.

A faunal survey was undertaken during the exploration of the cave, but only a few cavernicoles were recorded. They included cave crickets, phalangodid harvestmen, a depigmented troglophile garnmarid shrimp (Hyalella meinerti) found in a large pool, and a troglobitic trichopolydesmid millipede found on the roof of the terminal chamber.

References

External links
 The Venezuela '73 British Karst Research Expedition survey of Haitón del Guarataro
 Video of a December 2018 descent by members of the Sociedad Venezolana de Espeleologia

Geography of Falcón
Caves of Venezuela
Limestone caves
Wild caves
Tourist attractions in Falcón